Antonio Williams may refer to:

 Antonio Williams (basketball) (born 1997), American basketball player
 Antonio Williams (running back) (born 1997), American football player
 Antonio Williams (seaman) (1825–1908), American naval officer
 Antonio Williams (wide receiver) (born 2004), American football player

See also
 William Antonio (born 1975), Filipino-American basketball player
 Antoni Williams (1939–2016), New Zealand pop singer